Aza Raskin (born February 1, 1984) is the co-founder of the Center for Humane Technology and of the Earth Species Project. He is also a writer, entrepreneur, inventor, and interface designer. He is the son of Jef Raskin, a human–computer interface expert who was the initiator of the Macintosh project at Apple.

Raskin is an advocate for the ethical use of technology, and has been critical of the effects that modern technology has on everyday lives and society. In the podcast Your Undivided Attention, along with Tristan Harris, Raskin has talked extensively about the power of information technology and the dangers it potentially poses to modern society. In 2019, he became a member of the World Economic Forum's Global AI Council.

Raskin coined the phrase, "freedom of speech is not freedom of reach," which was the title of an article that he wrote with Renée DiResta. The phrase is now widely used to refer to the large-scale implications of platform amplification and free speech. For example, it was publicly quoted by the comedian Sacha Baron Cohen, and was used by Twitter CEO Jack Dorsey to help explain the rationale for banning political advertisements on Twitter.

Raskin has continued his father's work on project Archy, has worked as the head of user experience at Mozilla Labs and as lead designer for Firefox, and has founded a number of companies. He is also the inventor of the infinite scroll. More recently, he has collaborated on virtual reality projects and on zooming user interface (ZUI).

Career

Personal projects
Aza Raskin gave his first talk on user interfaces, at age 10, at a meeting of the San Francisco chapter of the Special Interest Group on Computer-Human Interaction (SIGCHI). He holds bachelor's degrees in mathematics and physics from the University of Chicago.

In 2004, he worked with his father, Jef Raskin, at the Raskin Center for Humane Interfaces, on the development of Archy software, which is a user interface paradigm. In 2005, after his father’s death, he founded Humanized, Inc., where he continued working on the Archy paradigm and created the language-based, service-oriented Enso software.

During the devastating earthquake in Haiti in January 2010, Raskin collaborated with a group of other entrepreneurs (including Joshua Rosen, the art director of Steven Spielberg's movie A.I. Artificial Intelligence), to create a crowdsourced website, hosted at Haiti.com, which turned information about the earthquake’s effects, in real time, into interpretable map data. The data was used by several major non-governmental organizations who were helping on the ground in Haiti. 

Raskin is an active phishing researcher, best known for discovering the tabnabbing attack, which takes advantage of open browser tabs to launch phishing sites without the user's knowledge.

He also has a number of smaller projects, such as Algorithm Ink (based on Context Free), which generates art from a formal grammar.

In Wired UK magazine’s series, Rebooting Britain, Raskin advocated for iterative governance, and was featured on the magazine’s cover. He has also given a TED talk about new humane directions for computing.

Mozilla Corporation
In 2008, Humanized employees, including Raskin, joined the Mozilla Corporation as part of a hire-out. Raskin was named head of user experience at Mozilla Labs. In 2010, Raskin was appointed to the position of creative lead for Firefox. He has worked on several labs projects, including Ubiquity and Firefox for mobile, and he wrote the original specification for the geolocation application programming interface (API).

In 2010, Raskin introduced Tab Candy—the result of his work on the Firefox team at Mozilla. By organizing tabs spatially, Tab Candy allowed the user to "organize browsing, to see all of our tabs at once, and focus on the task at hand".

Computerworld called Tab Candy's initial design and alpha release "the best new browser feature since tabs were invented". Tab Candy—renamed Firefox Panorama—was incorporated into the initial Firefox 4 release (as a hidden default), but it was later removed from the default Firefox package and converted to an add-on.

Startups
Raskin has founded two other companies besides Humanized, including Songza, a music meta-search tool, and Bloxes, which sold furniture made out of cardboard. Songza was acquired in late 2008 by Amie Street, an Amazon-backed company. Songza was eventually bought by Google and now powers much of Google Play. Songza was also responsible for enabling the creation of mood- and activity-based playlists.

By the end of 2010, Raskin  had left Mozilla to co-launch a start-up company called Massive Health. His goal was to apply design principles to the goal of maintaining health. In 2011, Fast Company conferred its Master of Design award on him for his work as co-founder of Massive Health. On April 16, 2012, Massive Health announced that Raskin would lead the company as its “chief vision officer”. In 2013, Massive Health was acquired by the Jawbone company.

Earth Species Project
In 2017, Raskin founded the nonprofit Earth Species Project, a non-profit organization focused on using AI to decode non-human communication. The project was the subject of an NPR Invisibilia podcast episode in 2020.

Opinions on technology use
As one of the co-founders of the Center for Humane Technology, Raskin has been an advocate for the ethical use of technology, and is critical of the far-reaching and often negative effects that modern technology has on everyday lives and society. He has given talks on this topic for Wired magazine and The Wall Street Journal, as well as Bits & Pretzels, Slush, Humanity 2.0, and Laurie Segall.

In 2019, Raskin became a member of the World Economic Forum's Global AI Council.

Media and other activities
In 2018, Raskin was featured on the cover of Off Screen Magazine. In 2019, he was included in The Art of Curiosity, a book profiling 50 contemporary innovative and influential thinkers, published by the Exploratorium to commemorate its 50th anniversary. In 2019, in recognition of Raskin’s work as a collaborative multimedia artist, he was tapped to be a guest curator for Ars Electronica's 40th anniversary exhibit. and has exhibited his artwork at an exhibition about North and South Korea.

Raskin has also been featured in Forbes’s 30 Under 30, and included in Fast Company’s “Most Creative People" list.

In April 2020, Laurie Segall did a podcast interview of Raskin, in which he spoke about the potential long-term effects of the increased use of information technology during the COVID-19 pandemic.

Personal life
Aza Raskin married Wendellen Li in August 2015. The couple has since divorced.

References

Citations

Bibliography

Writing

 
 (contributor)

Talks

External links

Earth Species Project

1984 births
Living people
American computer programmers
Human–computer interaction researchers
Jef Raskin
Mozilla developers
University of Chicago alumni
20th-century American Jews
21st-century American Jews